Bernard Voorhoof (10 May 1910 – 18 February 1974) was a Belgian footballer, for 34 years the Belgium national team top scorer with 30 goals in 61 matches. He was joined by Paul Van Himst in 1972 who needed 81 matches to score the same number of goals.
Both are now surpassed by Romelu Lukaku and Eden Hazard.

Career
He started his career at Lierse SK and stayed there for 21 years. With Lierse, he scored 350 goals in 529 matches and won 2 Belgian First Division Titles and a third unofficial title in the shortened 1940−41 season. He also played one season with R.R.F.C. Montegnée before retiring in 1949, age 39.

He was part of Belgium's team at the 1928 Summer Olympics, but he did not play in any matches. Voorhoof played in the 1930, 1934 and 1938 World Cups, being one of six known people (5 players and 1 match official) to have appeared in all three of the pre-war World Cups. At the World Cup held in Italy, Voorhoof scored twice in Belgium's 2−5 defeat to Germany on 27 May 1934. These were the first Belgian goals in a FIFA World Cup, as the Belgium national team failed to find the net in 1930.

He held the Belgian caps record from 5 May 1938 (when he equalled the total of Armand Swartenbroeks) until 13 April 1958, when his total was surpassed by Vic Mees. He held the Belgian record of goals since 13 March 1938, when he equalled the total of Robert De Veen, until  Paul Van Himst equalled his tally of 30 international goals for Belgium on 17 June 1972.

Honours

Player 

 Lierse S.K.

 Belgian First Division: 1931–32, 1939–40, 1940–41, 1941–42
 Belgian First Division: runner-up: 1934–35, 1938–39

Individual 

 Former Belgium's most capped player: 1938–1958 (61 caps)
 Former Belgium's national record goalscorer: 1940–2017 (30 goals)

References

External links
 

1910 births
1974 deaths
Belgian footballers
Belgium international footballers
Association football forwards
Olympic footballers of Belgium
Footballers at the 1928 Summer Olympics
1930 FIFA World Cup players
1934 FIFA World Cup players
1938 FIFA World Cup players
Lierse S.K. players
R.R.F.C. Montegnée players
People from Lier, Belgium
Footballers from Antwerp Province